The 2000 Masters (officially the 2000 Benson & Hedges Masters) was a professional non-ranking snooker tournament that took place between 6 and 13 February 2000 at the Wembley Conference Centre in London, England.

Matthew Stevens won the title on his second attempt after 1996 by defeating Ken Doherty, who had made his second final in a row, 10–8. On the 15th frame of the final, Doherty attempted a maximum break, but he missed the final black at 140. This was the highest break of the tournament.

Field
Defending champion John Higgins was the number 1 seed with World Champion Stephen Hendry seeded 2. Places were allocated to the top 16 players in the world rankings. Players seeded 15 and 16 played in the wild-card round against the winner of the qualifying event, Ali Carter (ranked 142), and Marco Fu (ranked 35), who was the wild-card selection. Ali Carter, Marco Fu and Fergal O'Brien were making their debuts in the Masters.

Wild-card round
In the preliminary round, the wild-card players plays the 15th and 16th seeds:

Main draw

Final

Qualifying
Ali Carter won the qualifying tournament, known as the 1999 Benson & Hedges Championship at the time. Karl Burrows made his only maximum break against Adrian Rosa.

Century breaks 
Total: 13
 140, 118, 104  Ken Doherty
 137, 106, 104  Stephen Hendry
 126, 113  Ronnie O'Sullivan
 122, 118  Matthew Stevens
 117  Jimmy White
 112  Anthony Hamilton
 101  Stephen Lee

Jimmy White's century was scored in the wild-card round.

References

Masters (snooker)
Masters
Masters Snooker
February 2000 sports events in the United Kingdom